German submarine U-381 was a Type VIIC U-boat built for Nazi Germany's Kriegsmarine for service during World War II. She failed to return in May 1943 and was declared missing in unknown circumstances.

The boat was laid down on 26 April 1941 at the Howaldtswerke in Kiel as yard number 12, launched on 14 January 1942 and commissioned on 25 February; Kapitänleutnant Wilhelm-Heinrich Graf von Pückler und Limpurg was her CO throughout her career.

She did not sink any ships.

Sunk by HMS Duncan (escorting convoy SC130 Halifax to Liverpool) commanded by Captain Peter Gretton. 
[source: The Battle of the Atlantic by Jonathan Dimbleby, 2015 (Penguin Books) Chpt20]

Design
German Type VIIC submarines were preceded by the shorter Type VIIB submarines. U-381 had a displacement of  when at the surface and  while submerged. She had two shafts and two  propellers.

U-381 was fitted with five  torpedo tubes (four fitted at the bow and one at the stern), fourteen torpedoes, one  SK C/35 naval gun, 220 rounds, and a  C/30 anti-aircraft gun. The boat had a complement of between forty-four and sixty.

Service history
She began her service life in the 5th U-boat Flotilla, a training organization, between 25 February 1942 and 30 September of the same year, before moving on to the 7th flotilla for operations.

First patrol
U381s first sortie took her from Kiel to a point three-quarters of the way across the Atlantic before steaming empty-handed to St. Nazaire in France.

Second patrol
Her next patrol was no better, starting and finishing in St. Nazaire between 19 December 1942 and 19 February 1943, a total of 63 days at sea. She was unsuccessfully attacked on the return leg west of Portugal by a Catalina flying boat of No. 202 Squadron RAF.

Third patrol and loss
U-381s third patrol ended abruptly after 52 days when she was sunk with the loss of all hands, probably on or around 21 May 1943. She was lost in mid-Atlantic (south of Greenland) through unknown circumstances.

Previously recorded fate

Wolfpacks
U-381 took part in nine wolfpacks, namely:
 Panther (11 – 20 October 1942)
 Veilchen (20 October – 5 November 1942)
 Delphin (26 December 1942 – 14 February 1943)
 Adler (11 – 13 April 1943)
 Meise (13 – 27 April 1943)
 Star (27 April – 4 May 1943)
 Fink (4 – 6 May 1943)
 Inn (11 – 15 May 1943)
 Donau 1 (15 – 21 May 1943)

References

Bibliography

External links

1942 ships
Missing U-boats of World War II
Ships built in Kiel
U-boats commissioned in 1942
U-boats sunk in 1943
World War II submarines of Germany
German Type VIIC submarines
U-boats sunk by unknown causes
Maritime incidents in May 1943